Junundat, alternatively known as Junandot, Ayonontout, and Sunyendeand, was a Wyandot Indian village located at the mouth of the Sandusky River, near modern-day Wightmans Grove, Ohio.  Junundat was founded in 1739 by a tribe of Wyandots moving south from the vicinity of Detroit under the leadership of Nicholas Orontony, after migrating to escape the aggressive Ottawa tribe. The village was a hub for trade in the region, until it was abandoned in 1747 following French aggression.

Name
Junundat is alternatively known as Junandot, Ayonontout, or Sunyeneand. It is also incorrectly referred to as Sunyendeand or Junqueindundeh, though these describe other towns in the same region.

The name "Junundat" means "one hill", while Junqueindundeh means "it has a rock".

Location
Junundat was located near the mouth of the Sandusky River. The site had a good water supply, food, and arable land, making it attractive to both Indians and European settlers. The village's exact location has not been definitively determined, because of conflicting historical accounts and erosion in the area. Junundat was most likely located near present-day Wightmans Grove, Ohio, given a description of its location in Frederick Webb's Handbook on American Indians.

History
Nicholas Orontony, an 18th-century Wyandot leader, moved south from Detroit in 1739, and founded the village of Junundat. Orontony's goal was to distance himself from the aggressive Ottawa tribe. However, this move was viewed as a defection by the French to the English, as part of the lead-up to the French and Indian War. After the founding of the village, Orontony emerged as the leader of the Ohio's Wyandots.

The Wyandots did trade with the English more than the French, due to their higher-quality and cheaper goods. Junundat welcomed English traders, becoming a trading hub in the region. The French attempted to stop the Wyandots from trading with the English, by attempting to bribe and intimidate them. The Wyandots continued trading regardless, fortifying Junundat in 1746, and launching attacks against the French. Orontony's attacks were referred to as the "Conspiracy of Nicolas" and "Orontony's Rebellion".

In September 1747, French reinforcements began to arrive in the area. France, feeling threatened by Orontony, responded with significant force. Orontony viewed the battle as hopeless, abandoning the area with his tribe and traveling south. He settled a new village named Conchake, near present-day Coshocton, Ohio.

References

Bibliography

History of Ohio
Populated places established in 1739
1739 establishments in North America
Native American populated places
Former Native American populated places in the United States